The 1998 NAIA football season, as part of the 1998 college football season in the United States, was the 43rd season of college football sponsored by the NAIA.

The season was played from August to November 1998, culminating in the 1998 NAIA Football National Championship, played this year on December 19, 1998 at Jim Carroll Stadium in Savannah, Tennessee.

Azusa Pacific defeated Olivet Nazarene in the championship game, 17–14, to win their first NAIA national title.

Jack Williams, running back from Azusa Pacific, was named the 1998 NAIA Football Player of the Year.

Conference standings

Conference champions

Postseason

 †  demarcates Overtime
 ‡ Game played at Kankakee, Illinois

See also
 1998 NCAA Division I-A football season
 1998 NCAA Division I-AA football season
 1998 NCAA Division II football season
 1998 NCAA Division III football season

References

 
NAIA Football National Championship